The Georgian Group is a British charity, and the national authority on Georgian architecture built between 1700 and 1837 in England and Wales. As one of the National Amenity Societies, The Georgian Group is a statutory consultee on alterations to listed buildings, and by law must be notified of any work to a relevant listed building which involves any element of demolition.

History 
Founded in 1937 by Lord Derwent, Robert Byron and the journalist Douglas Goldring (who went on to become the first secretary), the Group was originally part of the Society for the Protection of Ancient Buildings. Sir Nikolaus Pevsner, the poet and author Sir John Betjeman, Sir John Summerson, Robert Byron, the architect Sir Albert Richardson, Oliver Messel, and Sir Osbert Sitwell were among its most prominent early active members. Since 1971, The Georgian Group has been a national amenity society.

Work 

The Georgian Group acts as a statutory consultee in the planning process in England and Wales, when consideration is being given to proposals to alter or demolish listed buildings dating, in whole or in part, from between 1700 and 1837. The Victorian Society plays a similar role for buildings built between 1837 and 1914. It is notified of many thousands of applications each year. (In Scotland the Architectural Heritage Society of Scotland, formerly the Georgian Group of Edinburgh, is the relevant statutory consultee).

The Group has a similar role in the Church of England and Church in Wales faculty systems, and also advises the internal planning bodies of the Methodist, Roman Catholic, Baptist and United Reformed Church, on alterations to listed churches and chapels, including on the re-ordering or removal of historic fixtures and fittings.

Its present headquarters is at 6 Fitzroy Square, London W1, a large Robert Adam town house which it has restored. Its extensive library and an important collection of architectural watercolours and engravings, the Pardoe Collection, are housed within its headquarters and are available for public examination by appointment.

Since the early 1980s The Georgian Group has employed specialist regional caseworkers to undertake its advisory work within the planning process. Any member of the public can ask the Group for assistance in preventing the destruction of a Georgian building, although the Group's resources are limited. There are four casework regions: London and the South East, Central and Northern England, South West England and the Cotswolds, and Wales. The caseworkers are responsible to a Senior Caseworker and a committee of expert advisers. Dr John Martin Robinson was the founder of its specialist Casework Committee, a group of architects, architectural historians and conservation professionals who regularly meet to discuss controversial development schemes. The Georgian Group also has specialist representatives on conservation advisory panels in many English local authority areas.

Architectural Awards 

The Georgian Group's Architectural Awards, held annually since 2003, celebrate exemplary conservation and restoration projects in the UK, Isle of Man or Channel Islands. Traditionally taking place in autumn each year, they provide an opportunity to recognise those who have shown vision and commitment in restoring Georgian buildings and landscapes of the long eighteenth century, from 1660 to 1840.
The award categories are: Restoration of a Georgian Country House; Restoration of a Georgian Interior; Restoration of a Georgian Building in an Urban Setting; Reuse of a Georgian Building; Restoration of a Georgian Garden or Landscape; New Building in the Spirit of the Georgian Era; New Building in a Georgian Context. 

Previous winners include the Great Pagoda, Kew Gardens, the Saloon at Brighton Pavilion, the Painted Hall at Greenwich, Pitzhanger Manor in Ealing and Hillsborough Castle in County Down, Northern Ireland, as well as numerous private houses.

Grants 

The Georgian Group's small grants fund for the repair and restoration of Georgian buildings, monuments and fixtures and fittings is called the F. E. Cleary Heritage Fund (commonly known as The Cleary Fund). Grants are normally awarded annually in October.

Publications

The Group's magazine The Georgian is published bi-annually and sent to all members of the Georgian Group which include owners of Georgian property, professionals working in the fields of art, architecture, conservation, curation, academia and law plus those interested in Georgian architecture, preservation, restoration and decoration of buildings. The magazine plays an important role in providing communication to members. It contains vital information, with regular features on buildings at risk, practical tips for owners of Georgian properties, restoration projects (both exterior and interior), casework, art, news, reviews, events and activities.

The Georgian Group Journal, published annually, is the authoritative journal of record for early modern architecture in Britain between 1660 and 1840 and was first published in 1986. It is cited more often than any other title in Sir Howard Colvin's classic work of reference A Biographical Dictionary of British Architects 1600–1840, and is essential reading for anyone interested in architecture and related aspects of material culture during this period. 
The Group also publishes works on the care and restoration of Georgian buildings and interiors.

An online archive of past articles, together with a cumulative index, is available. The titles of all articles published in journal are also listed in the Royal Institute of British Architects (RIBA) Library catalogue, which hosts the RIBA's Architectural Periodicals Index.

See also
 Irish Georgian Society

References

External links
 
 The Georgian Group Magazine
 The Georgian Group Journal
 The RIBA Library
 

Organizations established in 1937
18th century in England
Clubs and societies in London
Architecture organisations based in the United Kingdom
Arts organisations based in the United Kingdom
Heritage organisations in the United Kingdom
Historical societies of the United Kingdom
Historic preservation
Architecture groups
Georgian era